Povoletto (Friulian: Paulêt) is a comune (municipality) in the Province of Udine in the Italian region Friuli-Venezia Giulia, located about  northwest of Trieste and about  northeast of Udine.

The municipality of Povoletto contains the frazioni (subdivisions, mainly villages and hamlets) Salt, Grions del Torre, Bellazoia, Belvedere, Marsure di Sotto, Marsure di Sopra, Magredis, Savorgnano del Torre, Ravosa, Siacco, and Primulacco.

Povoletto borders the following municipalities: Attimis, Faedis, Nimis, Reana del Rojale, Remanzacco, Udine.

Demographic evolution

References

External links
 www.comune.povoletto.ud.it

Cities and towns in Friuli-Venezia Giulia